The  is a fictitious being that originated on the Internet as a Japanese urban legend. First mentioned on websites in 2001, the Kunekune is typically described as having a slender, white, paper - or fabric-like humanoid shape, and is usually said to appear in fields on hot summer days. Its name, Kunekune, is derived from its alleged behavior of wiggling its limbs. Explanations for the Kunekune include its appearances being the result of confusion with scarecrows or wick drains.

Description 
The Kunekune is said to resemble a slender, white humanoid shape, like a paper mannequin or a piece of fine fabric. It is said that the being can be found at lunchtime during hot summer days. The Kunekune lingers in widely extended rice fields or acres, in rare cases it might be found over the open sea. Its limbs are said to wiggle permanently, as if there was a straight gust of wind, even if it was a windless day. This behaviour gave the being the Japanese name "Kunekune", meaning "to twist", "to wiggle" or "to meander".

The Kunekune allegedly can only become visible from a distance; witnesses may see field workers or others closer to a Kunekune who do not seem to be aware of it. In some variations, if an individual tries to look at it up close, they will go insane. In other versions, if someone touches it, or simply comes too close, the Kunekune will kill them. Even looking at it from a distance for too long is said to be unwise. If someone does not approach or make contact with the Kunekune, it is said that the Kunekune will ignore them.

Background 
Kunekune first appeared in a short horror story posted on 2channel in 2001. The story was well-received on 2channel, inspiring other users to share their own similar (mostly made up) stories. Kunekune stories are all written in the first person singular in an attempt to make them look like eyewitness reports. A similar phenomenon can be observed with the case of the Slender Man and with Hanako-san.

It is said to have originated from a story (probably a fiction) posted on a ghost story posting site in 2000. The story was modified by another person, and in 2003 it was posted on 2ch's "occult board" after clearly stating that this story was a work of fiction. However, in the process of handing it down on the internet, the disclaimer that the story was a work of fiction fell out, and only the ghost story part went on its own. In the same year, it became a hot topic on the "Folklore and Mythology Board", and both the "Occult Board" and the "Folklore and Mythology Board" created threads dedicated to "Kunekune". Eventually, various stories of experiences began to be written, and the variation of stories increased. After that, the topic of "Kune Kune" developed in 2ch spread to external like-minded sites, and it will be developed in the form of voice, image, video, etc. Furthermore, not only on the Internet, but also by occult writers, publications, including magazines, began to pick up.

Another possible explanation might be thick fog clouds, which appear over the fields during lunchtime. A third possibility might be hallucinations, created by heat stroke and dehydration during hot summer days.

References

External links 
 Kunekune at scaryforkids (English)
 Background information about the Kunekune at blog.livedoor.jp (Japanese)
 Collected stories about the Kunekune at totalmatomedia.com (Japanese)

Japanese legendary creatures
Fictional ghosts
Fakelore
Internet memes
Japanese urban legends